Minamoto no Shigeyuki (Japanese: 源 重之) (died 1000) was an early Heian waka poet and nobleman. He was designated a member of the Thirty-six Poetry Immortals and one of his poems is included in the famous anthology Hyakunin Isshu. His remaining works include a poetry collection known as the Shigeyukishū (重之集).

External links 
E-text of his poems in Japanese

Japanese male poets
Minamoto clan
1000 deaths
Year of birth unknown
9th-century Japanese poets
Hyakunin Isshu poets